Pedda Elikicherla is a village and Gram panchayat in Chowderguda mandal of Ranga Reddy district, Telangana, India.

Demographics
According to Indian census, 2001, the demographic details of Pedda Yelkicherla is as follows:
 Total Population: 	4,246 in 761 Households.
 Male Population:    2,110 and Female Population: 2,136
 Children Under 6-years of age: 837 (Boys - 425 and Girls -	412)
 Total Literates: 	1,273

References

Villages in Ranga Reddy district